Muthu Tharanga Sri Nilupuli Peiris (born April 30) is a Sri Lankan film actress fashion model and teledrama actress.

Early life
She had her education at the Roman Catholic School, Kadawatha and finally at the Holy Family Convent, Kirimateiyagara.

Career
She learned dancing from Channa & Upuli's dancing academy and with influence of another student who came for the classes she entered into the fashion world. Nilhan Seneviratne is the person who helped her to take part in Tele-dramas.
Muthu debuted in the mega teledrama Vasudha during 2005, 2006 and 2007.

References

Srilankan Model Muthu Tharanga Profiles and Photos

External links
 Watch Muthu Tharanga's teledrama 'Meda Gedara' on gossip lanka news

Year of birth missing (living people)
Living people
Sri Lankan television actresses
Sri Lankan female models